Washington's Headquarters may refer to:
 Ford Mansion, Morristown, New Jersey, December 1, 1779 to June 7, 1780
 George Washington's Headquarters (Cumberland, Maryland), as a colonel in 1755 to 1758, revisited as US Commander in Chief in 1794
 Longfellow House–Washington's Headquarters National Historic Site, Cambridge, Massachusetts, July 1775 to April 1776
 Keith House (Upper Makefield Township, Pennsylvania), December 14 to 24, 1776
 Moland House, Hartsville, Warwick Township, Bucks County, Pennsylvania
 Washington's Headquarters (Valley Forge), Pennsylvania, December 24, 1777 to June 18, 1778
 Washington's Headquarters State Historic Site, Newburgh, New York, April 1782 to August 1783

See also 
 Washington House (disambiguation)
 List of Washington's Headquarters during the Revolutionary War

Architectural disambiguation pages